Moranbong or Moran Hill (literally "PeonyHill", often "PeonyPeak") forms a park located in central Pyongyang, the capital of North Korea. Its  summit is the location of the Pyongyang TV Tower.

There are multiple monumental structures located on Moran Hill. They include the Arch of Triumph, Kim Il-sung Stadium, and Kaeson Revolutionary Site. At the foot of the hill is the Jonsung Revolutionary Site, which conveys the "revolutionary achievements" of President Kim Il-sung and the Hungbu Revolutionary Site which is associated with the history of leader Kim Jong-il and includes trees bearing slogans written during the independence revolutionary struggle.

The area surrounding the hill is now a recreation area, including the Moranbong Theatre, the Kaeson Youth Park, an open-air theatre in the Youth Park, the Moran Restaurant, an afforestation exhibition and a small zoo. The Okryu Restaurant is also located nearby.

See also
 Pyongyang Castle 
 Moranbong Band
 Moranbong Sports Club

References

External links

Jonsung Revolutionary Site picture album at Naenara

Moran Hill
Moran Hill